The men's +100 kilograms (Heavyweight) competition at the 2002 Asian Games in Busan was held on 30 September at the Gudeok Gymnasium.

Schedule
All times are Korea Standard Time (UTC+09:00)

Results

Main bracket

Repechage

References
2002 Asian Games Report, Page 462

External links
Official website

M101
Judo at the Asian Games Men's Heavyweight